Gov. Dix-Sept Rosado Airport  is the airport serving Mossoró, Brazil. Since May 27, 1953 the airport is named after Jerônimo Dix-sept Rosado Maia (1911-1951), former Mayor of Mossoró and Governor of Rio Grande do Norte, who died on a Lóide Aéreo Nacional air crash near Aracaju on July 12, 1951.

It is operated by Infracea.

Airlines and destinations

Access

See also

List of airports in Brazil

References

External links

Airports in Rio Grande do Norte